This is a list of all seasons played by FC Drita in national and European football, from 1999 to the most recent completed season.

This list details the club's achievements in all major competitions.

Seasons

External links
 Official website
 Drita at Soccerway.com
 List of Kosovo champions at RSSSF.com

Drita